Surinder Singh Kanda v The Government of the Federation of Malaya (1962) 28 MLJ 169 was a leading case in Malaysia.

Background
Officer Surinder Singh Kanda " was supplied with a report of the board of inquiry. The question arose whether the hearing by adjudicating officer was vitiated by Insp. Kanda not being given any opportunity of correcting or contradicting the report."

Findings 
Lord Denning noted that 

It also defined constitutional rights

References

External links
Legal Aid: A Facet of Equality before the Law - The International and Comparative Law Quarterly, Vol. 12, No. 4 (Oct., 1963), pp. 1133-1164
Constitutional Problems of Malaysia - The International and Comparative Law Quarterly, Vol. 13, No. 4 (Oct., 1964), pp. 1349-1367

Malaysian case law
1962 in case law
1962 in Malaya